Mohan Kankanhalli from the National University of Singapore was named Fellow of the Institute of Electrical and Electronics Engineers (IEEE) in 2014 for contributions to multimedia content processing and security.

References

External links
 Official Website

Fellow Members of the IEEE
Living people
Year of birth missing (living people)
Place of birth missing (living people)